This is a list of Duch women's One-day international cricketers. The Netherlands women's national cricket team played Women's One Day International cricket from 1984 until 2011. After 11 years, in May 2022, the ICC announced the Netherlands as one of five women's sides to gain ODI status. After this announcement, on 22nd August 2022, they played their first ODI against Ireland women's national cricket team. To date, 94 players have appeared for the Netherlands.
A One Day International, or an ODI, is an international cricket match between two representative teams, each having ODI status. An ODI differs from test matches in that the number of overs per team is limited, and that each team has only one innings. The list is arranged in the order in which each player won her first ODI cap. Where more than one player won her first ODI cap in the same match, those players are listed alphabetically by surname.

Key

List of WODI cricketers
Statistics are correct as of the Netherlands women's most recent ODI match, against Thailand on 26 November 2022.

Notes

References

 
ODI cricketers
Netherlands